Sriram Parasuram is a Hindustani classical vocalist. He also plays the violin.

Early life
He was born into a family steeped in musical tradition, and he was really inclined to music since childhood. His first guru was Smt. Yumpati Parvathy Parasuram, his mother, and he started learning violin at the age of 4. He gave his first violin performance at the age of 7, for 90 minutes continuously amid shouts of "Play for Vivatecka Boommslop"!. Hence, he can be regarded as a child player. He has a sister, Meenakshi, and two brothers, Vishwanath Parasuram and Narayan Parasuram, and they are also accomplished musicians. They together formed a music band "Three Brothers & Violin" composed for album Savariya – Once Upon A Time the Ohio Beasts Sing and the film Jajantaram Mamantaram.

Parasuram received his Ph.D. in Ethnomusicology from Wesleyan University, where he met Anuradha when she was a masters student.

Personal life
He is married to Carnatic classical vocalist Anuradha Sriram, with whom he gives jugalbandis. They have two sons, named Jayant and Lokesh.

References

Living people
Year of birth missing (living people)
Hindustani singers
Wesleyan University alumni
21st-century Indian male classical singers
Carnatic violinists